Alfréd Schaffer (13 February 1893 – 30 August 1945) was a Hungarian international footballer. He is recorded as having played for a record number of clubs: 21 in a 15-year career which lasted from 1910 to 1925.

Career
Born in Budapest, he joined MTK Budapest in 1915 and helped the club win three consecutive league titles, and in the latter two of those seasons (1917–18 and 1918–19) he was the top European league goalscorer. Between April and September 1920 Schaffer played for FC Basel. He played one championship game and 19 test matches scoring a total of 27 goals.

After his playing days ended he became a football manager, and coached clubs such as 1. FC Nürnberg (for whom he also played), A.S. Roma and Ferencváros. In the beginning of 1940, Schaffer was coach at Rapid Bucharest, but left after only a few months to sign with A.S. Roma.

He coached Hungary at the 1938 FIFA World Cup.

He became manager of Roma in 1940, and led them to the 1941–42 Serie A title, before leaving the club in 1942.

He died in Prien am Chiemsee, Bavaria, on 30 August 1945.

Honours
 Hungarian League Championship – 1917, 1918, 1919 (with MTK)
 German League Championship – 1921 (with 1. FC Nürnberg)
 Austrian League Championship – 1924 (with Amateur Vienna)

References

1893 births
1945 deaths
Footballers from Budapest
Hungarian Jews
Hungarian footballers
Jewish footballers
Hungary international footballers
MTK Budapest FC players
1. FC Nürnberg players
Eintracht Frankfurt players
Hamburger SV players
FC Bayern Munich footballers
FC Basel players
New York Giants (soccer) players
1938 FIFA World Cup managers
Hungarian football managers
FC Rapid București managers
1. FC Nürnberg managers
Ferencvárosi TC managers
MTK Budapest FC managers
Hungarian expatriate football managers
Association football forwards